Lin Bing-chao (formerly Benny Wijaya, born October 28, 1973 in Jakarta, Indonesia) is a retired Taiwanese tennis player.

Lin represented his native country as a qualifier at the 1992 Summer Olympics in Barcelona, where he was defeated in the first round by Canada's Andrew Sznajder.

The right-hander Lin reached his highest ATP singles ranking on October 10, 1994, when he became World No. 240.

References

External links
 
 

1973 births
Living people
Indonesian people of Chinese descent
Indonesian emigrants to Taiwan
Olympic tennis players of Taiwan
Sportspeople from Jakarta
Taiwanese male tennis players
Tennis players at the 1992 Summer Olympics
Asian Games medalists in tennis
Tennis players at the 1990 Asian Games
Tennis players at the 1994 Asian Games
Tennis players at the 1998 Asian Games
Universiade medalists in tennis
Medalists at the 1990 Asian Games
Medalists at the 1994 Asian Games
Medalists at the 1998 Asian Games
Asian Games silver medalists for Indonesia
Asian Games bronze medalists for Indonesia
Asian Games bronze medalists for Chinese Taipei
Southeast Asian Games silver medalists for Indonesia
Southeast Asian Games bronze medalists for Indonesia
Southeast Asian Games medalists in tennis
Competitors at the 1991 Southeast Asian Games
Universiade silver medalists for Chinese Taipei
Universiade bronze medalists for Chinese Taipei
Medalists at the 1997 Summer Universiade
Medalists at the 1999 Summer Universiade